Three States is an unincorporated community in Caddo Parish, Louisiana, Miller County, Arkansas, and Cass County, Texas. The community is at the point where three states meet: Texas, Arkansas, and Louisiana. In 2000, the population was 45.  The Louisiana side of Three States is part of the Shreveport – Bossier City metropolitan area, while the Arkansas side is part of the Texarkana metropolitan area.

References

Unincorporated communities in Louisiana
Unincorporated communities in Texas
Unincorporated communities in Cass County, Texas
Unincorporated communities in Caddo Parish, Louisiana